Una Carta Al Cielo is an album by Lucha Reyes released on the FTA label (FLPS-110) in 1971. The album was produced by Viñico Tafur. It was Reyes' second album.

Track listing
Side A
 "Una Carta Al Cielo" (Salvador Oda)
 "Castigo" (Adrián Flores Albán)
 "Propiedad Privada" (Modesto López)
 "Remembranzas" (Pedro Espinel)
 "Te Quiero Mas" (Antonio Florencio)
 "San Miguel De Piura" (Artidoro Obando García)

Side B 
 "Contigo Y Sin Ti" (Augusto Polo Campos)
 "Dolor Y Odio" (Angel Aníbal Rosado)
 "Ya Ves" (Augusto Polo Campos)
 "Jamas Impedirás" (José Escajadillo)
 "Siempre Te Ayudare" (Juan Mosto)
 "El Payandé" (José Vicente Holguín, Luis Eugenio Albertini)

References

1971 albums
Spanish-language albums